The 1902–03 Football League season was Aston Villa's 15th season in the First Division, the top flight of English football at the time. The season fell in what was to be called Villa's golden era.

During the season Howard Spencer and Albert Evans  shared the captaincy of the club. Spencer returned, having taken the 1901–02 season off in order to rest his knee and ankle for twelve months in the hope of recovering from an injury. Billy Garraty, great-great grandfather of Jack Grealish, made 30 appearances during the season.

Alex Leake joined Aston Villa from Small Heath in July 1902, when he was 31, and stayed five years.  In a 1901 profile in the Daily Express, C.B. Fry wrote:

Football League

First team squad
  Alf Wood, 35 appearances
  Billy George, 33 appearances, conceded 35
  Alex Leake, 32 appearances
  Howard Spencer, 31 appearances
  Billy Garraty, 30 appearances
  Joe Bache, 28 appearances
  Jasper McLuckie, 24 appearances
  George Johnson, 24 appearances
  Tommy Niblo, 21 appearances
  Albert Wilkes, 21 appearances
  Billy Brawn, 20 appearances
  Willie Clarke, 20 appearances
  Micky Noon, 20 appearances
  Albert Evans, 18 appearances
  Joe Pearson, 17 appearances
  Jack Shutt, 15 appearances
  Bobby Templeton, 11 appearances
 Harry Cooch, 5 appearances, conceded 12 
  George Harris, 4 appearances
  Tom Perry, 4 appearances
 NEW Harry Griffin, 1 appearance
 NEW Jim Fisher,  1 appearance
  Oscar Evans,  2 appearances
 NEW Arthur Lockett, 1 appearances

References

Aston Villa F.C. seasons
Aston Villa